Northern Wells Community Schools is the school district that serves extreme Northern Wells County, Indiana.

Northern Wells consists of five schools: Norwell High School, Norwell Middle School, Lancaster Central Elementary School, Ossian Elementary School, and Bethlehem Evangelical Lutheran Church & School.

NWCS serves the towns of Ossian, Uniondale, Tocsin, Zanesville, Markle and the extreme outskirts of the town of Bluffton.

The district was formed after the 1967 consolidation of six township schools, with four original schools: OES, LCES, NMS, and NHS in 1967.

Norwell High School

Norwell High School is at the intersection of U.S. Route 224 and Norwell Road just outside of Ossian, Indiana.

Features of the campus include a football field, baseball diamond, tennis courts, track and field, and over two acres of open grass for soccer.

Norwell High School has won the state championship for the best band performance in the US State of Indiana at Indianapolis for the last five years.

During the Christmas season of 2013, Norwell High School's Marching Band & Show Choir students went to Walt Disney World in Lake Beuna Vista, Florida for a marching band and choir performance.

The administrative staff of Norwell High School is as follows.
 Kam Meyer - Principal
Kelby B. Weybright - Dean of Students & Athletic Director 
Kristie George - Treasurer & Assistant Secretary
Kaley Gryzch = Guidance Office Secretary & Co-Assistant Secretary

Norwell Middle School
The administrative staff of Norwell Middle School is as follows.

Andrew Enderle - Principal
 Joel Reinhard - Assistant Principal/Athletic Director
Holly S. Morgan - Dean of Students 
 - secretary 
 - Assistant Secretary & Treasurer
Tanya Milostan-  Librarian

Ossian Elementary School
Ossian Elementary School currently stands where the old Ossian High School was before Northern Wells' consolidated all six township schools.

The administrative staff of Ossian Elementary School is as follows.

Dee Dee Larkey- Principal
Theresa Casto - Assistant Principal
Ginger Butcher - Dean of Students
Cami Shelton - Guidance Counselor
Jenni Coratti - Treasurer
Janice Kenline - Secretary
Ann McNabb - Full-Time Elementary School Nurse

Lancaster Central Elementary School

Lancaster Central Elementary School is located in rural Bluffton, Indiana, on Jackson Street near Indiana Highway 1.

Bethlehem Evangelical Lutheran Church & School

Bethlehem Evangelical Lutheran Church & School is a private school located on the eastern outskirts of Ossian.

Recent renovations

Over the last several years, Northern Wells Community Schools superintendents tried to make it so that the Norwell High School campus could be fully renovated, as the school needed repairs and revitalization.

In the spring of 2013, residents in the Northern Wells Community Schools district finally approved the US$5,400 referendum to renovate and revitalize the Norwell High School campus.

In addition to renovating the Norwell High School campus, the district added new electronic signs to four of Northern Wells' five main schools.

The renovations of the high school included a new cafeteria, a better air conditioning, heating and ventilation system, a new school office, 15 new school buses, and iPad mobile devices.

References

External links

Northern Wells Community Schools

School districts in Indiana
Education in Wells County, Indiana
School districts established in 1967
1967 establishments in Indiana